The 1979 Kano State gubernatorial election occurred on July 28, 1979. PRP candidate Abubakar Rimi won the election.

Abubakar Rimi was elected the PRP Deputy National Secretary in December 1978 at Lagos. He became the gubernatorial candidate of the party on June 25, 1979.

Results
Abubakar Rimi representing PRP won the election. The election held on July 28, 1979.

References 

Kano State gubernatorial elections
Kano State gubernatorial election
Kano State gubernatorial election